Her Silent Sacrifice is a 1917 American silent film romantic drama directed by Edward José and starring Alice Brady.

Cast
Alice Brady as Arlette
Henry Clive as Richard Vale
R. Payton Gib as Prince Boissard
Edmund Pardo as Sarthe
Blanche Craig as Countess Coralie
Arda La Croix as Chaupin

Preservation status
The film is preserved in the Library of Congress, Packard Campus for Audio-Visual Conservation collection.

References

External links

1917 films
American silent feature films
American films based on plays
Films directed by Edward José
American black-and-white films
American romantic drama films
1917 romantic drama films
Selznick Pictures films
1910s American films
Silent romantic drama films
Silent American drama films